Safe Haven is a 2013 American romantic drama fantasy thriller film starring Julianne Hough, Josh Duhamel and Cobie Smulders. The film marks the final film role for actor Red West. It was released theatrically in North America on February 14, 2013. The film was directed by Lasse Hallström, and is an adaptation of Nicholas Sparks' 2010 novel of the same name. The film was originally set for a February 8 release.

Plot
The film begins with a terrified woman, Erin, barefoot and covered in blood, running to an elderly neighbor’s house for shelter. She arrives at a bus station, now with cut and bleached hair. Cops appear and start looking for her, but she gets on a bus and escapes them. Finally, Erin arrives at Southport, North Carolina.

She introduces herself as Katie at the general store, gets a job as a waitress, and rents a small house on the edge of town. She befriends her neighbor, Jo, and meets Alex Wheatley who operates the local general store. He is a widowed father of two young children, Josh, who has a strained relationship with him, and Lexie.

Katie soon begins a relationship with Alex, and becomes a mother figure to Josh and Lexie. Meanwhile, Kevin Tierney, a Boston police detective, prepares wanted posters for "Erin", a woman accused of first-degree murder. Alex sees the poster in the police station and notices the picture bears a striking resemblance to Katie. He confronts her, causing a huge fight which ends in their breakup and her moving out.

As Katie is about to leave town, Alex intercepts her, saying he has fallen in love with her, begging her not to leave and promising to keep her safe. Katie reluctantly returns his love, and decides to stay in Southport (though still apprehensive of bringing danger upon his family). She tells him that she fled there to escape her abusive and alcoholic cop husband. They got in a big fight and she stabbed him in self-defense before fleeing in a panic.

Meanwhile, Kevin is suspended for creating the false wanted posters - for crimes that were not committed - and for drinking on the job. He turns out to be Katie's (Erin's) husband, still alive and well. A flashback reveals that on the night Katie ran away, she stabbed Kevin with a knife when he attacked her in a drunken rage. Enraged, he breaks into Katie's former neighbor's home in Boston and gets the phone number to the restaurant where Katie works. Arriving in time for the town's Fourth of July parade, a severely intoxicated Kevin sees Katie kissing Alex, which enrages him. That evening, Katie has a dream that she is standing on the docks watching the fireworks when Jo comes up and tells Katie that "he" is here. Katie wakes up in the convenience store next to a sleeping Lexie when Kevin suddenly appears and confronts her, demanding that she go back with him. She refuses and tells him to leave. Kevin pulls a gun and pours gasoline all over the store, with the intent to burn it down.

Katie buys time by faking sympathy and agreeing to go back with him. When he lets his guard down, she pushes him into the water. A firework spark lands on the gasoline, igniting a fire that engulfs the store. Alex sees the burning store, quickly crosses the harbor by boat, and saves Lexie. Meanwhile, as Katie tries to fight off Kevin, the gun goes off and kills him.

After the fire, Alex recovers several letters written by his late wife Carly before she died. They were prepared ahead of time for memorable events such as Josh's eighteenth birthday and Lexie's wedding day. He also reconciles with Josh.

Jo later tells Katie that she will be leaving Southport soon. Katie thanks her for being a good friend and Jo tells her, "You deserve this, Katie. You belong here."

Alex gives Katie a letter with the words "To Her" on the envelope. It explains that Alex must be in love to have given her the letter and she hopes that she feels the same, wishing that she could be there with them. Enclosed with the letter is a photo of Alex's late wife. Katie realizes that her neighbor "Jo" was the ghost of Carly watching over them.

Cast

 Julianne Hough as Erin Tierney / Katie Feldman, A young woman who flees her abusive husband and Alex's new girlfriend.
 Josh Duhamel as Alex Wheatley, Katie's new boyfriend and a widower who struggles to raise his two kids after the death of his wife.
 Cobie Smulders as Carly Wheatley/Jo, a local woman who befriends Katie
 David Lyons as Detective Kevin Tierney, Katie's abusive husband. 
 Mimi Kirkland as Lexie Wheatley, Daughter of Alex and who befriended Katie
 Noah Lomax as Josh Wheatley, Son of Alex who has a rough and strained relationship with his father due to his mother's death.
 Irene Ziegler as Mrs. Feldman
 Robin Mullins as Maddie
 Red West as Roger. This was West's last film role before his death in July 2017
 Juan Carlos Piedrahita as Detective Ramirez
 Cullen Moss as Deputy Bass
 Mike Pniewski as Lieutenant Robinson

Production
According to a 2012 Twitch Film article, Keira Knightley had entered into "early talks" to play Katie, but had to drop out due to scheduling conflicts with the 2013 film Begin Again.

The film began principal photography on June 18, 2012 in Wilmington and Southport, North Carolina. Parts of it were filmed in Louisiana and the opening scene with Katie on the Coach America bus is on the Linn Cove Viaduct along the Blue Ridge Parkway near Grandfather Mountain in Linville, North Carolina.

Reception

Box office
Safe Haven grossed US$71,349,120 in North America and US$26,245,020 in other territories for a worldwide total of US$97,594,140.

In its opening weekend, the film grossed US$21,401,594, finishing third at the box office behind A Good Day to Die Hard (US$24,834,845) and Identity Thief (US$23,674,295).

Critical response
Critical reaction for Safe Haven was largely negative. On Rotten Tomatoes it has a rating of 13%, based on reviews from 146 critics, with an average rating of 4.00/10. The consensus reads, "Schmaltzy, predictable, and melodramatic, Safe Haven also suffers from a ludicrous plot twist, making for a particularly ignominious Nicholas Sparks adaptation." On Metacritic the film has a score of 34 out of 100, a "generally unfavorable" score, based on 33 reviews. Audiences surveyed by CinemaScore gave the film a grade B+.

Richard Roeper called the film "Bat. Bleep. Crazy." and asks if the filmmakers or a key character is out of her mind. Roeper expresses disbelief at the twist ending, and "how insane the whole thing is". Aside from the twist ending he would have given the film 2.5 stars, but ultimately gives it only 1.5 out of four stars. Peter Bradshaw, writing for The Guardian, called Safe Haven's setting "a sugary vision of small-town America that does not correspond with the real world at any point." Peter Travers of Rolling Stone gave the film zero stars out of four, and concluded his review by stating: "I hate Safe Haven. It's a terrible thing to do to your Valentine."

Accolades
Despite the film's negative reception, it was nominated for a Teen Choice Awards in the category Choice Movie: Romance. Mimi Kirkland received a Young Artist Award nomination in the category "Best Supporting Young Actress in a Feature Film".

Home media

Safe Haven was released on DVD and Blu-ray on May 7, 2013.

References

External links
 
 
 
 
 

2013 films
2013 romantic drama films
2010s romantic thriller films
American romantic drama films
American romantic thriller films
Films about domestic violence
Films about families
Films about widowhood
Films based on romance novels
Films based on works by Nicholas Sparks
Films directed by Lasse Hallström
Films scored by Deborah Lurie
Films set in Boston
Films set in North Carolina
Films shot in North Carolina
Relativity Media films
Temple Hill Entertainment films
Films produced by Wyck Godfrey
2010s English-language films
2010s American films